Francis Kruse (1854–1930) was a German politician.

1854 births
1930 deaths
German politicians
Date of birth missing